Uğur Güneş (born 10 November 1987) is a Turkish actor. He rose to fame by playing the character Tugtekin Bey in Diriliş: Ertuğrul for which he received the Best Actor of the Year Award by the Ankara Ministry of Youth. Güneş received great appreciation for his performance in the İsimsizler TV series & was awarded the Jury Special Award at Young Turkey Summit Academy Awards 2017. He received the best series trio award for his role in Bir Zamanlar Çukurova at the 24th Golden Lens Award Ceremony 2019.

Career
Güneş made his debut on TV with the Turkish drama series Yeniden Başla (Start Again), which aired on TRT in 2011. Next, he appeared in ATV TV series Benim İçin Üzülme (Don't Worry for Me). The show continued for two seasons. Güneş made his first appearance in cinema with Tamam miyiz? (Are We OK?) in 2013 & later appeared in the Turkish horror movie Şeytan-ı Racim (Devil) in the same year. 

He became popular with his role as Tugtekin Bey in the popular Turkish historical drama Diriliş: Ertuğrul (Resurrection: Ertuğrul) and received the Best Actor Award by the Ministry of Youth and Sports in 2016. In 2014 he played the character of Çetin in the TV series Urfalıyam Ezelden (Devoted). He also worked in a mini historical series Seddülbahir 32 Saat in 2016 alongside Murat Ünalmış, İbrahim Çelikkol. He played the character of Fatih in the action TV series İsimsizler (Nameless Squad) alongside Hande Soral. Lastly he started in Bir Zamanlar Çukurova TV series in 2018 and won critics' praises. He also played Cemal Tunalı, a patriotic character in the movie Cep Herkülü: Naim Süleymanoğlu, based on the life of Naim Süleymanoğlu.

Personal life
Uğur Güneş spent his childhood in Ankara. He has one brother and one sister. He started acting at Ankara Art Theatre by the suggestion of a friend. After graduating from Ankara University Language, History and Theatre School, Güneş took acting as a profession.

Filmography

Awards and nominations

References

1987 births
Living people
Turkish male film actors
Turkish male television actors
21st-century Turkish male actors